John N.A. Hooper is an Australian marine biologist and writer on science. He is the current Head of Biodiversity & Geosciences Programs at the Queensland Museum. His research has included studying the possible medical benefits of marine sponges, including beta blockers for heart disease, and for compounds to combat illnesses like gastro-intestinal disease and cancer. In 2007 he was a member of the Discussion Panel On Marine Genetic Resources for the eighth annual United Nations Informal Consultative Process for Oceans and the Law of the Sea (UNICPOLOS).

Notable works 
Together with Rob van Soest, Hooper co-edited the influential book Systema Porifera: A Guide to the Classification of Sponges. In addition, the Web of Science lists over 90 articles in peer-reviewed journals that have been cited over 1650 times, with an h-index of 24. His three most-cited (>75) articles are:

See also 
Taxa named by John Hooper

References

External links 
John Hooper Profile at Queensland Museum Research People

Living people
Australian marine biologists
Year of birth missing (living people)